Helen L. Bee (born 1939) is a psychologist and author of several books on the subject of human development, including both child development and adult development.

Education
Bee was one of the two daughters of Austin Bee, who influenced her deeply.  She received her BA from Radcliffe College in 1960 (magna cum laude) and her Ph.D. from Stanford University in 1964, under the tutelage of Robert Sears and Eleanor Maccoby.

Academic 
After two years as an assistant professor at Clark University, in Worcester, MA, Bee moved to the University of Washington, where she taught for seven years, receiving tenure during that time.   After leaving the university, she turned to writing books full-time.  The best known of her books is "The Developing Child", now in its 12th edition.  Her own favorite of the several books, however, is "The Journey of Adulthood", which included, for the first time in any such text, a chapter on spiritual development.

Family
Bee married George Douglas and had two children, Rex Douglas and Arwen Douglas, in that marriage.  She married Carl R. de Boor, an emeritus professor at the University of Wisconsin–Madison, in 1991.  She lives on Orcas Island, in Washington state.

In retirement, she volunteers for a number of non-profit organizations on Orcas Island, including Camp Indralaya and OPAL Community Land Trust.

Major works
 The Developing Child 
 The Journey to Adulthood by Helen Bee and Barbara Bjorklund U.S.A. Prentice Hall. 1999. 0130109533
 Essentials of Child Development and Personality; Helen Bee
 Lifespan Development by Helen Bee and Denise Boyd
 Child and Adolescent Development (9th ed.) Bee, H. (2000). [e-text]. Boston, MA: Pearson Custom Publishing.

References

Developmental psychologists
1939 births
Living people
Radcliffe College alumni
Stanford University alumni
Clark University faculty
University of Washington faculty
Writers from Tacoma, Washington